Henry Lybrand Farm, also known as the Connelly Farm, is a historic home and farm located near Lexington, Lexington County, South Carolina. It was built about 1835, and is a two-story, rectangular, frame dwelling. It is sheathed in weatherboard and has a gable roof. The front façade features a one-story shed-roofed porch supported by square wood posts. The house has a one-story rear ell, built about 1900. Also on the property is the only intact cotton gin house left in the county, a cook's house, a small wash house, a smokehouse, a log barn, a two-story log barn, a corncrib, and a granary.

It was listed on the National Register of Historic Places in 1983.

References

Farms on the National Register of Historic Places in South Carolina
Houses on the National Register of Historic Places in South Carolina
Houses completed in 1835
Houses in Lexington County, South Carolina
National Register of Historic Places in Lexington County, South Carolina